The Tethys Trench was an ancient oceanic trench that existed in the northern part of the Tethys Ocean during the middle Mesozoic to early Cenozoic eras.

Geology
The Tethys Trench  formed when the Cimmerian Plate was subducting under eastern Laurasia, around 200 million years ago, in the Early Jurassic. The Tethys Trench extended at its greatest during Late Cretaceous to Paleocene, from what is now Greece to the Western Pacific Ocean. Subduction at the Tethys Trench probably caused the continents Africa and India to move towards Eurasia, which resulted in the opening of the Indian Ocean. When the Arabian and Indian plates collided with Eurasia, the Tethys Ocean and the trench closed. Remnants of the Tethys Trench can still be found today in Southeastern Europe and southwest of Southeast Asia.

See also
Geology of the Himalaya
Oceanic trench

References

Historical geology
Oceanic trenches
Paleogene paleogeography
Natural history of Asia
Natural history of Europe